The Beijing Electron–Positron Collider II (BEPC II) is a Chinese electron–positron collider, a type of particle accelerator, located in Shijingshan District, Beijing, People's Republic of China. It has been in operation since 2008 and has a circumference of 240.4 m.

It was intended as a charm factory and continues the role of CLEO-c detector.  The center of mass energy can go up to 4.6 GeV with a design luminosity of 1033 cm−2·s−1.  Operations began in summer 2008 and the machine has run at multiple energies.

History 
The construction of the original Beijing Electron Positron Collider was approved in 1983, as China was emerging from the Cultural Revolution, based on a proposal developed by Xie Jialin, who went on to oversee the construction of the machine.  The construction of this collider was considered so important that then vice-premier Deng Xiaoping attended the groundbreaking in 1984 and returned in 1988 as the machine neared operation.

The original Beijing Electron Positron Collider was commissioned in 1989 and decommissioning began in 2000 as plans were developed for BEPC II, although operation continued until 2004.  The shape of the BEPC has been described as a tennis racquet, with a linac with a beam energy of from 1.5 to 2.8 GeV serving as the handle, injecting counter-rotating beams of particles into a storage ring at the head, giving collision energies in the range from 3.0 to 5.6 GeV.  The BEPC was built to investigate tau-charm physics, using the Beijing Spectrometer.  Major accomplishments of the original BEPC included precision measurement of the Tau mass.

BES III

The BES III (Beijing Spectrometer III) is the main detector for the upgraded BEPC II.

BES III uses a large superconducting solenoid to provide a 1-tesla magnetic field, and also features a helium gas-based tracking chamber and an electromagnetic calorimeter using 6240 caesium iodide crystals.

See also
 Large Electron–Positron Collider

 Super Charm-Tau factory

 Electron–positron annihilation

References

2008 establishments in China
Projects established in 2008
Particle physics facilities
Particle experiments
Science and technology in the People's Republic of China
Buildings and structures in Beijing

External Links 
Record for BEPC-BES II experiment on INSPIRE-HEP